Hallaton railway station was a former railway station serving the village of Hallaton, Leicestershire, on the Great Northern and London and North Western Joint Railway. The station was located about a quarter of a mile east of the village on the road to Horninghold. The station opened in 1879 and closed to regular traffic in 1953. The Leicester to Peterborough service was withdrawn in 1916. To the south-west was Welham Junction.

References

Disused railway stations in Leicestershire
Railway stations in Great Britain opened in 1879
Railway stations in Great Britain closed in 1953
Former Great Northern Railway stations
Former London and North Western Railway stations